Carl Peter Værnet (April 28, 1893 – November 25, 1965) was a Danish doctor at Buchenwald concentration camp. He experimented extensively with hormones and other experiments to "treat" homosexuality by injecting synthetic hormones into mainly non-consenting men's testicles. His research was under the authority of Gestapo chief Heinrich Himmler.

Civilian career 

Værnet had trained as a doctor in Copenhagen and set up his first practice there. He took further courses in Germany, France and Netherlands where he acquired a special interest in hormone treatments. Although he had joined the National Socialist Workers' Party of Denmark in the late 1930s, his medical career waned due to the dubious quality of his research and also because he was considered a collaborator in his native country. In order to further his hormone research, he was introduced to the leading SS doctor Ernst Grawitz by the operatic tenor Helge Rosvaenge. He was then introduced to Heinrich Himmler and given a medical post in Prague in early 1944.

Buchenwald 

Between June and December 1944, Carl Værnet experimented on 17 male inmates at Buchenwald who were forced to undergo an operation with an artificial gland. Although none of the inmates died as a direct result of his research, at least two contracted infections which proved fatal. There is no evidence that any of the inmates were castrated. His research proved inconclusive and he quickly lost favour with his paymasters.

Life as a fugitive 

After the war, he was arrested in Copenhagen and interrogated at Alsgades School. Although the Danish authorities wanted to press charges for his SS involvement, he feigned heart trouble and escaped. It appears he tried to sell the hormone research to DuPont in 1946. He later fled to Brazil and then Buenos Aires, Argentina, where he died in 1965.

See also 
 Persecution of homosexuals in Nazi Germany and the Holocaust

References 

1893 births
1965 deaths
Danish endocrinologists
Sexual orientation change efforts
SS officers
Holocaust perpetrators
The Holocaust in Denmark
Nazis in South America
Persecution of homosexuals in Nazi Germany
Danish Nazis
Danish emigrants to Argentina
Danish Waffen-SS personnel